XHPKAS-FM was a radio station on 93.3 FM in Tunkás, Yucatán, known as Ki'in Radio.

History
XHPKAS was awarded in the IFT-4 radio auction of 2017 to Debate por Yucatán, an independent news site, and was the cheapest station purchased at auction with a final bid of just 5,000 pesos. The station operated from 2018 to 2019. On November 22, 2019, Russell Arjona Tamayo, the owner of Debate por Yucatán, surrendered the concession, noting that he had developed glaucoma and his eyesight was severely impaired, requiring him to seek medical attention and preventing him from operating the station.

References

Radio stations in Yucatán
Radio stations established in 2018
2018 establishments in Mexico
2019 disestablishments in Mexico
Radio stations disestablished in 2019
Defunct radio stations in Mexico